Rheindahlen may refer to
Rheindahlen, a town which belongs to Monchengladbach West in the German state of North Rhine-Westphalia
RAF Rheindahlen, named after the town
JHQ Rheindahlen, also named after the town